Jean Fridolin Nganbe Nganbe (born 11 May 1988) is a Cameroonian footballer who plays as forward.

Career

Club
Prior to the start of the 2015 season, Nganbe signed for RoPS.

Career statistics

References

External links
RoPS Profile

Living people
1988 births
Association football forwards
Cameroonian footballers
Veikkausliiga players
Ykkönen players
Canon Yaoundé players
AC Oulu players
Odra Wodzisław Śląski players
Oulun Palloseura players
FC Lahti players
Vaasan Palloseura players
Rovaniemen Palloseura players
FC Haka players
Cameroonian expatriate footballers
Expatriate footballers in Finland
Expatriate footballers in Poland
Cameroonian expatriate sportspeople in Finland
Pallokerho Keski-Uusimaa players